Andrew Butterfield (born 1 July 1972) is an English professional golfer. He played on the European Tour and it's development tour, the Challenge Tour, between 1996 and 2012. He won one tournament on the Challenge Tour, in June 2009 at The Princess in Sweden.

Career

Butterfield was born in London, England. He turned professional in 1993. In 1995, he won the Kent Open and gained a place on the Challenge Tour for the following season. He played on the Challenge Tour until qualifying for the European Tour through Q-School in 1999. Butterfield did not perform well enough on tour in 2000 to retain his card and had to go back to the Challenge Tour in 2001. He got his European Tour card back through Q-School again in 2001 and played on the European Tour in 2002 but did not find any success on tour. He returned to the Challenge Tour and played there until 2005 when he finished 4th on the Challenge Tour's Order of Merit which earned him his European Tour card for 2006. He did not play well enough in 2006 to retain his tour card but was able to get temporary status on tour for 2007 by finishing 129th on the Order of Merit. He played on the European Tour and the Challenge Tour in 2007 and has played only on the Challenge Tour since 2008. He picked up his first win on the Challenge Tour in Sweden at The Princess in June 2009. He also won an event on the PGA EuroPro Tour in 2004.

Professional wins (3)

Challenge Tour wins (1)

Challenge Tour playoff record (0–1)

PGA EuroPro Tour wins (1)

Other wins (1)
1995 Kent Open

Playoff record
European Tour playoff record (0–1)

Results in major championships

Note: Butterfield only played in The Open Championship.
CUT = missed the half-way cut

See also
2005 Challenge Tour graduates
2009 Challenge Tour graduates

References

External links

English male golfers
European Tour golfers
Golfers from London
People from the London Borough of Bromley
1972 births
Living people